"Still" is a song written by Lee Brice, Kyle Jacobs and Joe Leathers, and recorded and co-produced by American country music artist Tim McGraw. It was released in February 2010 as the third single from his tenth studio album, Southern Voice.

Content
"Still" is a moderate up-tempo country song, backed primarily by electric guitar. The song's male narrator describes remembering his favorite place to be in his past, and reminding himself that he can "just be still" in order to reach it.

Critical reception
The song was met with positive reception. Los Angeles Times critic Randy Lewis said that the song had "a pulsating modern rock beat behind his Louisiana twang[…]but lyrically it digs a bit deeper than the melodramatic but superficial hits so closely associated with McGraw." Bobby Peacock of Roughstock rated it 4.5 stars out of 5, saying that "Tim has been forging a darker, deeper and frankly, more interesting sound with each successive album[…]With 
'Still,' he is playing all of his artistic strengths and proving that not all of country music has to sound the same." A less favorable review came from Stephen Thomas Erlewine of Allmusic, who called it  "a slow, spacy crawl[…]that would not be out of place on a record by a U2 knockoff."

Chart performance
"Still" peaked at number 16 on the US Hot Country Songs chart.

References

2010 singles
2009 songs
Tim McGraw songs
Songs written by Lee Brice
Songs written by Kyle Jacobs (songwriter)
Song recordings produced by Byron Gallimore
Song recordings produced by Tim McGraw
Curb Records singles
Music videos directed by Sherman Halsey
Songs written by Joe Leathers